KS Azoty-Puławy is a men's handball club from Puławy, Poland, that plays in the Polish Superliga.

Team

Current squad
Squad for the 2022–23 season

Goalkeepers
1  Vadim Bogdanov
 12  Mateusz Zembrzycki
 16  Wojciech Borucki
Left wingers
3  Tobiasz Górski
 98  Piotr Jarosiewicz
Right wingers
 21  Marek Marciniak
 88  Dawid Fedeńczak
Line players 
 27  Ivan Burzak
 75  Kelian Janikowski

Left backs
 10  Kacper Adamski
 15  Michał Jurecki
 23  Jan Antolak
Centre backs
 34  Nacho Vallés
 35  Bartosz Kowalczyk
Right backs
7  Boris Zivkovic
 11  Rafał Przybylski

Transfers
Transfers for the 2022–23 season

 Joining
  Tobiasz Górski (LW) (from  SMS Płock)
  Kacper Adamski (LB) (from  Energa MKS Kalisz)
  Jan Antolak (LB) (from  SMS Kielce)
  Nacho Vallés (CB) (from  BM Benidorm)
  Marek Marciniak (RW) (from  Zagłębie Lubin)
  Marek Daćko (P) (from  Orlen Wisła Płock) ?
  Kelian Janikowski (P) (from  TORUS Wybrzeże Gdańsk)

 Leaving
  Wojciech Gumiński (LW) (to  Budnex Stal Gorzów)
  Antoni Łangowski (LB) (to  Gwardia Opole)
  Paweł Podsiadło (LB) (to  Grupa Azoty Unia Tarnów)
  Aliaksandr Bachko (CB) (to  Górnik Zabrze)
  Vladyslav Dontsov (RB) (end of loan  HC Motor Zaporozhye)
  Andrii Akimenko (RW) (to  Dinamo București)
  Dawid Dawydzik (P) (to  Orlen Wisła Płock)
  Łukasz Rogulski (P) (to  AEK H.C.)

External links
Official website 

Polish handball clubs
Sport in Lublin Voivodeship
Handball clubs established in 2003
2003 establishments in Poland
Puławy County